During its four-century history, New York City (also commonly known as New York) has been known by a variety of alternative names and euphemisms, both officially and unofficially. Frequently shortened to simply "NY" or "NYC", New York is also known as "The City" in some parts of the Eastern United States, in particular, New York State and surrounding U.S. states. New Yorkers also use "The City" to refer specifically to the borough of Manhattan.

Common nicknames

 The Big Apple – first used as a reference to the city's prominence in horse racing by John J. Fitz Gerald during the 1920s but made popular by a 1970s advertisement campaign
 The Capital of the World – popularized by the author E. B. White and by New York Mayor Rudy Giuliani
 The Center of the Universe – particularly in reference to Times Square
The City So Nice They Named It Twice – a reference to "New York, New York" as both the city and state, spoken by Jon Hendricks in 1959 on a jazz cover of Lorenz Hart and Richard Rodgers' song "Manhattan" on George Russell's album New York, N.Y., and popularized by New York-based late night talk show host David Letterman, who also used the phrase "the town so nice, they named it twice."
 The City That Never Sleeps – first recorded in full in newspaper articles in the early 1900s, including in 1907 in Phoenix, Arizona in reference to New York's evening mail delivery and in 1912 in Fort Wayne, Indiana about New York's new electric and gas lighting, though also recorded in similar forms in reference to the nightlife in neighborhoods like the Bowery as early as 1892 and likely in use during the 1880s. Popularized by John Kander and Fred Ebb's song "New York, New York" from the Martin Scorsese 1977 film of the same name.
 The Empire City – derived from George Washington in the alleged quote "Surely this is the seat of the empire!" though first published in an 1836 newspaper as "the Empire City of the New World"; also in reference to New York City's status as the most populous city in New York State, whose primary nickname is The Empire State.
 The Five Boroughs – a reference to the counties that consolidated into New York City in 1898, and often used to distinguish the city proper from Manhattan alone or the New York metropolitan area
 The Gay Capital of the World – a reference to New York City’s outsized influence upon LGBT culture worldwide
 Gotham – first used by Washington Irving in his satirical periodical Salmagundi in November 1807 as an allusion to the tale of the Wise Men of Gotham, and made popular as Gotham City, the location of Batman comics, first specified in December 1940's Batman #4, written by Bill Finger
 The Greatest City in the World – reflective of the city's overall global prominence and cultural diversity, and popularized by the song The Schuyler Sisters from Lin-Manuel Miranda's musical Hamilton
 The Melting Pot – a reference to the wide variety of ethnicities and language groups in the city, and popularized by various authors including playwright Israel Zangwill in his 1908 play The Melting Pot
Metropolis – popularized as the location of Superman comics, first specified in 1939 and itself an allusion to the setting of the Fritz Lang film Metropolis (1927), used to describe New York City in the daytime, in contrast to Gotham, sometimes used to describe New York City at night.

Historic nicknames
America's City – a term positioning New York City as emblematic of the country post 9/11, as its premier metropolis
Fun City – taken from a phrase in 1966 uttered by then mayor John Lindsay in response to being asked if he still liked being mayor during a crippling transit strike. This nickname was also later derisively played on by NYPD's largest police union, who used the term "Fear City" in response to city budget cutbacks during the 1970s.
The Modern Gomorrah – referring to the "sinfulness" and organized crime of Manhattan, first popularized by Reverend Thomas De Witt Talmage in 1875 at the Brooklyn Tabernacle

Historical names

Names by which the parts of New York City in Lower Manhattan were officially deemed during the 17th century included:

New Amsterdam – the original name of the Dutch colony from 1624 until 1665, when the English captured and renamed the colony during the Second Anglo-Dutch War. Derived from Fort Amsterdam, and though the city's administration at the time simply used the name "Amsterdam," the designation of "Nieuw" for the village north of the fort was popularized in the 1650s by Adriaen van der Donck in his pamphlets advertising the colony to potential settlers.
New Orange – the name given to the city during the brief period of 1673-1674 when the Dutch regained control of the city after the Third Anglo-Dutch War and then bargained it away in the Treaty of Westminster

References

New York City
Culture of New York City
New York City-related lists
Symbols of New York City